Kevin O'Connor, D.O. is an American physician and retired U.S. Army Colonel serving as the physician to the president.

Education
O'Connor attended college at St. Bonaventure University on a US Army Reserve Officers' Training Corps (ROTC) scholarship, graduating with a major in biology and minor in theology. In 1992, he graduated medical school from the New York Institute of Technology College of Osteopathic Medicine. He completed residency training in family medicine at The Mountainside Hospital in Montclair, New Jersey, where he served as chief resident in 1995. He also completed U.S. Army flight surgeon training and was designated a master flight surgeon in 2010.

Career
O’Connor served 22 years in the U.S. Army, including tours of duty with the 82nd Airborne Division, 75th Ranger Regiment, and United States Army Special Operations Command, and over a decade at the White House.
O'Connor has received the Combat Medic Badge. He is on faculty at George Washington University, where he served as the founding director of executive medicine. He worked for three years in the George W. Bush administration. In 2013, he was inducted into the Order of Military Medical Merit. He was appointed to serve as White House physician in 2006 under the Bush Administration. In 2009, O'Connor was named physician to the Vice President. In 2017, O'Connor retired from the US Army as Colonel. In January 2020, he was appointed medical director of St. Bonaventure University’s Franciscan Health Care Professions program. According to Biden's memoir Promise Me, Dad, O'Connor worked closely with the Biden family during Beau Biden's battle with brain cancer.

White House
A few days after his inauguration, president Joe Biden announced that he would appoint O'Connor as the White House physician. His predecessor, Dr. Sean Conley, was physician to president Donald Trump and departed the White House alongside Trump on January 20, 2021.

On July 21, 2022, O'Connor diagnosed Biden with COVID-19 and prescribed him with Paxlovid. There was commentary on O'Connor not briefing the White House Press Corps during Biden's illness, instead communicating through memoranda addressed to the White House Press Secretary, Karine Jean-Pierre.

References 

21st-century American physicians
American osteopathic physicians
Biden administration personnel
Family physicians
George Washington University faculty
Living people
New York Institute of Technology alumni
Physicians to the President
St. Bonaventure University alumni
United States Army colonels
United States Army Medical Corps officers
Year of birth missing (living people)